The 1968 Tracy tornado was an extremely powerful  F5 tornado that struck Tracy, Minnesota on Thursday, June 13, 1968, at around 7 o'clock. The tornado killed nine people and injured 125 others. The wind speeds of the tornado reached over 300 mph as it tracked  through Murray, Lyon and Redwood counties in southwestern Minnesota.  It is one of only two official F5 tornadoes that have occurred in Minnesota, although several other tornadoes that occurred before 1950 are estimated to have been F5 strength. The tornado destroyed 111 homes, caused major damage to 76, and caused minor damage to 114. Five businesses were destroyed and 15 others were damaged. Some homes in town only had their foundations left behind. A few farms outside of town were swept completely away, and extensive ground scouring occurred. An elementary school and 106 automobiles were destroyed, and a heavy boxcar was thrown more than a block by the storm. Two other boxcars were thrown 300 yards, and a steel I-beam was carried for two miles on a piece of roof. Hard rains and hail were also reported. A total of five tornadoes hit Minnesota on June 13, 1968, most of which were rated F0.

See also
 Climate of Minnesota
 List of North American tornadoes and tornado outbreaks
 Mid-June 1992 tornado outbreak
 List of F5 and EF5 tornadoes

References

External links
 Picture of Tracy tornado
 Tracy tornado image, as photographed by Archie Daniels of Tracy, MN.

F5 tornadoes
Tornadoes in Minnesota
Tornadoes of 1968
1968 in Minnesota
Lyon County, Minnesota
Murray County, Minnesota
Redwood County, Minnesota
June 1968 events in the United States